David Lynn Golemon (David L. Golemon) is the author of paranormal thriller novels, notably the Event Group Thrillers.

In Event, the first book in the Event Group series, Major Jack Collins is drafted into the covert Event Group and investigates a UFO incident seemingly related to the Roswell UFO incident. The books often involve famous events and people from history, such as Jack the Ripper and Czar Nicholas II.

Golemon's book Legend was a New York Times best seller.

Books

Event Group series
Event, St. Martin's Press, 2006
Legend, St. Martin's Press, 2007
Ancients, St. Martin's Press, 2008
Leviathan, St. Martin's Press, 2009
Primeval, St. Martin's Press, 2010
Legacy, St. Martin's Press, 2011
Ripper, St. Martin's Press, 2012
Carpathian, St. Martin's Press, 2013
Overlord, St. Martin's Press, 2014
The Mountain, St. Martin's Press, 2015
The Traveler, St. Martin's Press, 2016
Beyond the Sea, St. Martin's Press, 2017
Empire of the Dragon, Quoth Publications, 2018
Season of the Witch, Quoth Publications, 2019

The Supernaturals
The Supernaturals: A Ghost Story, Seven Realms Publishing, 2011
In the Still of the Night, St. Martin's Press, 2017

References

American male novelists
Living people
American thriller writers
21st-century American novelists
21st-century American male writers
Year of birth missing (living people)